Evergreen is the debut studio album by New Zealand music duo Broods, which was released on 22 August 2014. Following the release of their self-titled EP, Broods, earlier that year, the album includes two songs from that EP and the new single "Mother & Father". Upon its release, Evergreen debuted at number 1 on the New Zealand Albums Chart and was certified gold by Recorded Music NZ for sales exceeding 7,500 copies. Songs from the album were performed live during the first half of 2014. Produced by Joel Little, known for his work with fellow New Zealander Lorde, the album explores alternative pop music, with influences of indie genres.

Background and development
In January 2014, Broods released their self-titled debut EP, which was produced entirely by Joel Little. It was proceeded by the singles "Bridges" and "Never Gonna Change", which will both be on the album. The EP received very positive reviews and was successful in their home country of New Zealand, charting at number 2, behind Lorde's debut Pure Heroine. After the EP was released the duo embarked on a tour, which also went to the United States. During those concerts, songs from the album were previewed. In May and June, the duo opened the Australian and New Zealand tour dates for British singer-songwriter Ellie Goulding.

On June 12, the duo announced their first-ever New Zealand tour and on June 19 premiered the first single off the album, "Mother & Father". On July 3, MTV exclusively premiered the album track "L.A.F." and revealed the album artwork.

Reception

The album debuted at No. 1 on the New Zealand chart, and No. 5 on the Australian chart.
In the United States, the album reached No. 45 on the Billboard 200, No. 12 on the Top Rock Albums chart, selling 7,000 copies in its first week.  It has sold 32,000 copies in the US as of May 2016.

Singles
"Mother & Father" was released as the album's lead single on 19 June. It premiered June 18 on Zane Lowe's BBC Radio 1 show.

"L.A.F." was released digitally on 3 July 2014 as the first promotional "instant grat" single off the album. It has been confirmed as the second official single from the album, following the release of the song's music video on November 10, 2014. It is one of the tracks featured in the EA Sports video game, FIFA 15.

"Four Walls" was released digitally on 18 August 2014 as the second promotional "instant grat" single. It was later released exclusively in New Zealand as the third official single on January 24, 2015.

Promotional singles
"Everytime" was released in New Zealand on 21 August 2014 as the iTunes free single of the week, and serves as the third promotional single from Evergreen.

Track listing

Personnel
Credits adapted from Tidal.

Broods
 Caleb Nott – vocals
 Georgia Nott – vocals, piano , synthesizer programming 

Additional personnel
 Joel Little – producer, mixer, recording engineer, programming, synthesizer programming
 Vlado Meller – mastering engineer
 Olivia Nott – background vocals 
 Andrei Bildarean – assistant
 Bryn Roberts – assistant
 Jeremy Lubsey – assistant
 Richard Symons – assistant
 Adam Bryce – photography
 Anna Wili-Highfield – artwork

Charts

Weekly charts

Year-end charts

Certifications

Release history

References

2014 debut albums
Broods albums
Polydor Records albums
Island Records albums
Universal Music Australia albums
Albums produced by Joel Little